Bryn is a given name. Notable people with the name include:

 Bryn Allen (1921–2005), Welsh international footballer
 Bryn Apprill (born 1996), American voice actress affiliated with Funimation
 Bryn Atkinson (born 1982), Australian mountain bike racing cyclist
 Bryn Christopher (born 1985), British singer and songwriter
 Bryn Coudraye (born 1986), Australian rower
 Bryn Crossley (1958–2018), Welsh jockey
 Bryn Cunningham (born 1978), Irish rugby union player
 Bryn Davies (footballer) (1917–1990), Welsh professional footballer 
 Bryn Davies (musician) (born 1976), American musician
 Bryn Davies, Baron Davies of Brixton (born 1944), British trade unionist, actuary and politician
 Bryn Day (1919–1977), Welsh rugby union and rugby league footballer
 Bryn Elliott (1925–2019), English footballer
 Bryn Evans (disambiguation)
 Bryn Fôn (born 1954), Welsh actor and singer-songwriter
 Bryn Forbes (born 1993), American professional basketball player
 Bryn Gatland (born 1995), New Zealand rugby union player 
 Bryn Goldswain, Welsh rugby league footballer 
 Bryn Griffiths (writer), British writer
 Bryn Gunn (born 1958), English footballer
 Bryn Hall (rugby union) (born 1992), New Zealand rugby union player
 Bryn Halliwell (born 1980), English footballer
 Bryn Hargreaves (born 1985), English rugby league player
 Bryn Harrison (born 1969), British experimental composer
 Bryn Haworth (born 1948), British Christian singer-songwriter
 Bryn Hoffman (born 1997), Canadian pair skater
 Bryn Howells (1911–1983), Welsh rugby union and professional rugby league footballer
 Bryn Jones (disambiguation)
 Bryn Kenney (born 1986), American professional poker player
 Bryn Knowelden (1919–2010), English professional rugby league and association footballer
 Bryn Law (born 1969), Welsh football commentator 
 Bryn Lewis (1891–1917), Welsh international rugby union player
 Bryn Lockie (born 1968), Scottish cricketer
 Bryn McAuley (born 1989), Canadian voice actress
 Bryn Meredith (born 1930),  Wales rugby union international
 Bryn Merrick (1958–2015), Welsh bassist for the rock band The Damned
 Bryn Mooser (born 1979), American filmmaker and entrepreneur
 Bryn Morris (born 1996), English professional footballer
 Bryn Phillips (1900–1980), Welsh dual-code international rugby union and professional rugby league footballer
 Bryn Powell (born 1979), Welsh international rugby league footballer 
 Bryn Renner (born 1990), American football player and coach 
 Bryn Ritchie (born 1979), American soccer player 
 Bryn Roberts (1897–1964), Welsh trade union leader
 Bryn Roy (born 1988), Canadian football 
 Bryn Smith (born 1955), American baseball player
 Bryn Taylor (born 1980), American fashion stylist 
 Bryn Terfel (born 1965), Welsh opera singer
 Bryn Thomas (born 1979), South African cricketer
 Bryn Vaile  (born 1956), English sailor 
 Bryn Walters,  actor, dancer and choreographer
 Bryn West (born 1975), English cricketer
 Bryn Williams (born 1977), Welsh chef
 Bryn Williams-Jones (born 1972), Canadian bioethicist

See also
Bryn (surname)